Old Bridge is a census-designated place (CDP) in Old Bridge Township, in Middlesex County, New Jersey, United States. As of the 2010 United States Census, the CDP's population was 23,753. Despite the similarity in the name of the CDP and the township, the two are not one and the same, as had been the case for most paired Township / CDP combinations prior to the 2010 Census, in which the CDP was coextensive with a township of the same name.

Geography 
According to the United States Census Bureau, the CDP had a total area of 7.274 square miles (18.839 km2), including 7.100 square miles (18.389 km2) of land and 0.174 square miles (0.450 km2) of water (2.39%).

Demographics

Census 2010

Census 2000
As of the 2000 United States Census there were 22,833 people, 7,274 households, and 6,233 families living in the CDP. The population density was 1,250.5/km2 (3,238.5/mi2). There were 7,346 housing units at an average density of 402.3/km2 (1,041.9/mi2). The racial makeup of the CDP was 85.12% White, 3.76% African American, 0.14% Native American, 7.91% Asian, 0.03% Pacific Islander, 1.39% from other races, and 1.66% from two or more races. Hispanic or Latino of any race were 6.57% of the population.

There were 7,274 households, out of which 43.6% had children under the age of 18 living with them, 73.5% were married couples living together, 8.9% had a female householder with no husband present, and 14.3% were non-families. 12.0% of all households were made up of individuals, and 5.1% had someone living alone who was 65 years of age or older. The average household size was 3.11 and the average family size was 3.39.

In the CDP the population was spread out, with 27.5% under the age of 18, 6.8% from 18 to 24, 31.9% from 25 to 44, 23.1% from 45 to 64, and 10.7% who were 65 years of age or older. The median age was 37 years. For every 100 females, there were 96.4 males. For every 100 females age 18 and over, there were 91.9 males.

The median income for a household in the CDP was $73,824, and the median income for a family was $79,230. Males had a median income of $54,906 versus $36,345 for females. The per capita income for the CDP was $26,395. About 2.0% of families and 2.9% of the population were below the poverty line, including 3.6% of those under the age of 18 and 6.5% of those 65 and older.

Notable residents

References

Old Bridge Township, New Jersey
Census-designated places in Middlesex County, New Jersey